was a Japanese actor, comedian, singer, and guitarist. He won six awards for acting. His film credits stretch from 1960 to 1995.

Ueki came to fame through the comic jazz-band The Crazy Cats led by Hajime Hana. His major appearances were in the Musekinin Otoko film series, the comedy variety show Shabondama Holiday, the prime-time television series The Hangman, and the ten 2-hour television shows in the Nagoya Yomeiri Monogatari franchise.

He appeared in the Akira Kurosawa epic jidaigeki film Ran in 1985, receiving a nomination for the Japan Academy Prize for Outstanding Performance by an Actor in a Supporting Role, and earned the Japanese Academy, Kinema Junpo,and Mainichi film awards for best supporting actor for his role as the eccentric grandfather in Big Joys, Small Sorrows in 1987.

On stage, he portrayed Billy Flynn in the musical Chicago, voiced the Roddy McDowall role in the Japanese market release of Planet of the Apes, and served as the narrator in the Japanese version of Tom and Jerry.

His hit song with Hana Hajime and the Crazy Cats, Sūdara-bushi, placed in the Oricon top ten, and landed him an appearance on the NHK annual music spectacular Kōhaku Uta Gassen.

Ueki received the Purple Ribbon Medal of Honour in 1993 and the 4th Class Order of the Rising Sun in 1999.

Currently, new technology is being used to create a Vocaloid voicebank using his voice.

Discography

Albums 
 , 1966
 , 1971
 , 1990
 , 1991
 , 1992
 , 1995

Partial filmography

Films
 Tattoo Ari (1982)
 The Crazy Family (1984)
 Ran (1985) as Nobuhiro Fujimaki
 Ora Tōkyō sa Iguda (1985)
 Big Joys, Small Sorrows (1986) as Kunio Sugimoto
 Aitsu ni Koishite (1987)
 Maiko Haaaan!!! (2007)

Television
 Momotarō-zamurai (1976–77) as Saruno Inosuke

References 

1926 births
2007 deaths
Japanese male actors
Japanese comedians
Japanese jazz guitarists
Recipients of the Medal of Honor (Japan)
Vocaloid voice providers
20th-century guitarists
Recipients of the Medal with Purple Ribbon
Recipients of the Order of the Rising Sun, 4th class
20th-century comedians
20th-century Japanese male singers
20th-century Japanese singers
Male jazz musicians
Crazy Cats members